Methylsterol monooxygenase 1 is a protein that in humans is encoded by the MSMO1 gene.

Function

Sterol-C4-methyl oxidase-like protein was isolated based on its similarity to the yeast ERG25 protein. It contains a set of putative metal binding motifs with similarity to that seen in a family of membrane desaturases-hydroxylases. The protein is localized to the endoplasmic reticulum membrane and is believed to function in cholesterol biosynthesis. Alternatively spliced transcript variants encoding distinct isoforms have been found for this gene.

References

Further reading